FC Dynamo-2 Saint Petersburg was a Russian football team from Saint Petersburg. It was the farm-club for FC Dynamo Saint Petersburg.

History
Following Dynamo St. Petersburg's promotion to the second-tier Russian National Football League at the end of the 2016–17 season, the club decided to organize a farm-club. It was licensed to play in the third-tier Russian Professional Football League for the 2017–18 season. After the season, the parent club moved to Sochi, becoming PFC Sochi. The farm club was dissolved.

References

External links
  Official Website

Association football clubs established in 2017
Association football clubs disestablished in 2018
Defunct football clubs in Saint Petersburg
2017 establishments in Russia
2018 disestablishments in Russia